From 1990 to 2000, a total of 104 five-minute Pingu episodes were made at Trickfilmstudio in Russikon, Switzerland. The episodes were written by Silvio Mazzola, and were directed and animated by Otmar Gutmann using clay animation. A special twenty-five minute episode called "Pingu at the Wedding Party" (also known by its home video title A Very Special Wedding) was produced in 1997.

The series was revived from 2003 to 2006 for a further 52 episodes, now produced in the United Kingdom instead of Switzerland.

The leading numbers identify the series and episode number (e.g. 5.10 is episode 10 of series 5). Where applicable, it is denoted whether the title shown is an alternative rather than the main. Titles used by the BBC in television broadcasts or on BBC videos are indicated by the comment "BBC" at the end of the entry for a title. Titles used in North America on DVDs are similarly indicated, by "NA". This page lists all the episodes.

Series overview

Test animations

Original series

Series 1 (1990)

Series 2 (1991–94)

Series 3 (1995–96)

Series 4 (1998–2000)

Revival series

Series 5 (2003–04)

Series 6 (2005–06)

Special episode 
 "Pingu at the Wedding Party" (1997)

Music video 
 "7-11" (by Eskimo Disco) (2006)

Notes
No official episode title appears on screen in the original series so the lists were initially created from the titles used on various official DVD releases. The main episode titles for series 1-4 were taken from the official Japanese DVD releases and the alternative titles from the official European DVD releases, as well as titles used on BBC VHS releases. Episode titles for series 5-6 were taken from the European DVD releases. Changes have subsequently been made to these titles to bring them more into line with English usage and practice (e.g. to correct spelling and grammar) and to relate them to the titles used on UK DVDs produced by HIT Entertainment. Alternative titles have also been appropriately added, amended, etc. Title data have also been supplemented with information from other sources such as the titles used by the BBC for television broadcasts and on video tapes.

In the UK, the BBC appears never to have broadcast any of the normal 5-minute episodes from the latter half of series 3 (3.14 – 3.26) or from series 4 (4.1 – 4.26).  However, all the episodes from the latter half of series 3 (3.14 - 3.26) have been featured on BBC produced videos. Of the episodes that have been broadcast, all have been broadcast since 4 September 2006 inclusive. All of the 156 episodes, including Pingu at the Wedding Party have since been released on DVD by HIT Entertainment in the UK.

Between 2006 and 2007, after the ending of the original show, BBC, Nick Jr, and APTN in Canada were showing The Pingu Show, which was narrated by Marc Silk.

References

Pingu
Pingu
Pingu